The 1919–20 Northern Rugby Football Union season was the 25th season of rugby league football.

Season summary

A full championship competition returned after suspension during the First World War as well as a full Challenge Cup campaign.

Hull F.C. recorded their first Championship when they defeated Huddersfield 3-2 in the play-off final.

Huddersfield had ended the regular season as league leaders and won the Challenge Cup defeating Wigan 21-10.

Widnes won the Lancashire League and Huddersfield won the Yorkshire League. Oldham beat Rochdale Hornets 7–0 to win the Lancashire Cup, and Huddersfield beat Leeds 24–5 to win the Yorkshire County Cup.

Championship

Championship play-off

Challenge Cup

Huddersfield defeated Wigan 21-10 in the Challenge Cup Final played at Headingley, Leeds in front of a crowd of 14,000.

This was Huddersfield’s third Challenge Cup Final win in their third final appearance. They retained the trophy, having won the Cup in the last season before the suspension due to the First World War.

Sources
1919-20 Rugby Football League season at wigan.rlfans.com
The Challenge Cup at The Rugby Football League website

References

1919 in English rugby league
1920 in English rugby league
Northern Rugby Football Union seasons